Pelecymala is an extinct genus of sphenodontian reptile that lived in southwest England during the Triassic period. It has been recovered in recent studies as a primitive member of the group.

References 

Prehistoric reptile genera
Sphenodontia
Fossil taxa described in 1986